Peter Daly may refer to:

 Peter Daly (Irish republican) (1903–1937), Irish socialist and republican soldier
 Peter Daly (priest) (c. 1788–1868), Irish priest living in Galway
 Peter H. Daly (1941–2017), official in the United States Treasury
 Peter H. Daly (U.S. Navy) (born 1955), United States Navy vice admiral

See also
 Peter Dailey (disambiguation)
 Peter Daley (born 1950), American politician